Audea blochwitzi is a moth of the family Erebidae. It is found in the Democratic Republic of Congo (Katanga), Ethiopia, Malawi, South Africa, Tanzania, Zambia and Zimbabwe.

References

Moths described in 2005
Audea
Moths of Africa